Zouk Mikael (also spelled Zuq Mikha'il or Zouk Mkayel) is a town and municipality in the Keserwan District of the Keserwan-Jbeil Governorate in Lebanon. Its inhabitants are predominantly Melkite and Maronite Catholics.

The town is well known for its Ottoman-era souk (open-air market), a pedestrian market with arcades and shops cafés. It is also home to several monasteries and historic churches, such as the Saint George Church, the open-air Roman-era amphitheatre, which hosts live summer concerts. In 1999, the UNESCO declared Zouk Mikael a "City of Peace".

History
In 1838, Eli Smith noted  Zuk Mekayil as a village located in Aklim el-Kesrawan, Northeast of Beirut; the chief seat of the Maronites.

On 27 February 1994 an IED exploded inside the Maronite Notre Dame de La Deliverance Church killing ten worshippers and wounding 60.

Sports
Zouk Mikael is known as the Lebanese city of basketball, as it has the Stade Nouhad Naufal which was completed in 2015. It hosted the 2017 FIBA Asia Cup where the Lebanon national team reached the quarter-finals.

See also
Saydet al-Najat Church Explosion (Lebanon, 1994)

Twin towns
 Eu, France (2003)
 Rueil-Malmaison, France (2009)

References

Bibliography

External links
 Zouk Mkayel, localiban
 Official Zouk Mikael Municipality website
 Zouk Mikael City online website ( first website created 2002 by Tony J. BEAINO)

Populated places in Keserwan District
Maronite Christian communities in Lebanon
Melkite Christian communities in Lebanon